Thames International College, is an academic institution located at Surya Bikram Gyawali Mard, Old Baneswor, Kathmandu, Nepal offering a variety of undergraduate programs that leads to a degree from Tribhuvan University.

Organization and administration

Affiliations
All the programs at Thames are affiliated to Tribhuvan University. Established in 1959, Tribhuvan University is the oldest University in Nepal.

Partnerships
Thames International College has signed an articulation agreement with Webster University, St. Louis, Missouri.

Programs
 Bachelor of Arts - Social Work and Rural Development
 Bachelor of Business Administration
 Bachelor of Business Studies
 Bachelor of Information Management
 Bachelor of Journalism, Mass Communication and English

Student life

Office of Student Affairs
The Office of Student Affairs works with all aspects of students’ lives at Thames and collaborates with students, staff members, faculty, alumni, parents and other agencies to support the students.

Student organizations
 Student Council of Thames International College
 Rotaract Club of Thames International College
 The Management Club
 Information Technology Club
 Social Work Club of Thames
Interest Based Clubs:
 Dance
 Music
 Theater
 Emcee
 Sports, and more

References

Universities and colleges in Nepal